Political hip hop is a subgenre of hip hop music that was developed in the 1980s as a way of turning hip hop into a call for political and/or social action and a form of social and/or political activism. Inspired by 1970s political artists such as The Last Poets and musician Gil Scott-Heron, Public Enemy was the first predominantly political hip-hop group. The genre has helped to create a new form of social expression for subordinate groups to speak about their exclusions, injustices and lack of power. Political hip-hop is the use of hip hop music to send political messages to inspire action or social change or to convince the listener of a particular worldview. There is no all-encompassing political hip-hop ideology; rather, there are multiple perspectives that range anywhere from anarchism to Marxism to the values of the Five-Percent Nation. Hip hop and politics have long been intertwined, with many hip hop artists using their music as a means to speak out about political issues and express their views on current events. Over the years, there have been a number of hip hop songs that have addressed political issues such as police brutality, racism, and poverty, among others. Some well-known examples of political hip hop songs include "Fuck tha Police" by N.W.A., "Changes" by Tupac Shakur, and "Fight the Power" by Public Enemy.

Many hip hop artists have also been involved in political activism outside of their music. For example, Chuck D of Public Enemy has been involved in a number of political campaigns and organizations, and has used his music and public platform to speak out about issues such as police brutality and racism. Similarly, rapper and activist Common has been involved in a number of social justice causes, and has used his music to address issues such as police violence and racial inequality.

Conscious hip hop

Conscious hip hop (also known as socially conscious hip hop or conscious rap), is a subgenre of hip hop that challenges the dominant cultural, political, philosophical, and economic consensus, and/or comments on or focuses on social issues and conflicts. Conscious hip hop is not necessarily overtly political, but the terms "conscious hip hop" and "political hip hop" are sometimes used interchangeably. Conscious hip hop began to gain traction in the '80s, along with hip hop in general. The term "nation-conscious rap" has been used to more specifically describe hip hop music with strong political messages and themes. Themes of conscious hip hop include social conscience, Afrocentricity, religion, aversion to crime and violence, culture, the economy, or depictions of the struggles of ordinary people. Conscious hip hop often seeks to raise awareness of social issues, sometimes leaving the listeners to form their own opinions rather than aggressively advocating for certain ideas and demanding actions. Conscious hip hop artists often use their music to express their views on a wide range of topics, including politics, race, poverty, and the environment.

Some well-known examples of conscious hip hop artists include Common, Mos Def, Talib Kweli, and Kendrick Lamar. These artists are known for their thoughtful and thought-provoking lyrics, which often tackle complex and controversial issues.

In contrast to mainstream hip hop, which is often associated with materialism and violence, conscious hip hop is often seen as a more positive and uplifting form of the genre. Many conscious hip hop artists strive to inspire their listeners to think critically and make positive changes in their communities and the world.

Overall, conscious hip hop is a significant part of the hip hop landscape, and its artists continue to play a key role in raising awareness about important social and political issues.

History of political and conscious hip hop

Origins and early development 
Before the emergence of political hip hop—the Black Power Movement and the emphasis on black pride arising in the mid-1960's and blossoming in the early 1970s—inspired several commentaries that incorporated Black Power ideological elements. Songs expressing the theme of black pride include: James Brown's "Say it Loud (I'm Black and Proud)" (1969), and Billy Paul's "Am I Black Enough for You?" (1972). The proto-rap of Gil Scott-Heron is an early influence on political and conscious rap, though most of his earlier socially conscious and political albums fall within the jazz, soul, and funk genres. Following Ronald Reagan’s election as President in 1980, conditions in inner-city African-American communities worsened, and hip-hop political commentators began to increasingly address worsening social problems such as mass unemployment, police brutality, incarceration, inadequate public schools, political apathy, and oppression. One of the first socially conscious hip-hop songs was "How We Gonna Make the Black Nation Rise?" by Brother D with Collective Effort. The first extremely successful hip hop song containing conscious rap was Grandmaster Flash and the Furious Five's "The Message", an influential political and conscious hip hop track, decrying the poverty, violence, and dead-end lives of the urban poor of the time. Furthermore, the complex socio-political issues before hip hop and during all of its stages severely influenced its birth and direction.

Gangsta rap 
Early gangsta rap often showed significant overlap with political and conscious rap. Pioneers in the gangsta rap genre such as Ice-T, N.W.A., Ice Cube, and the Geto Boys blended the crime stories, violent imagery, and aggression associated with gangsta rap with socio-political commentary, using the now standard gangsta rap motifs of crime and violence to comment on the state of society and expose issues found within poor communities to society as a whole. These early gangsta rap artists were influenced in part by the bleak and often "revolutionary" crime novels of Iceberg Slim as well as hip-hop groups such as Public Enemy and Boogie Down Productions; groups that mixed aggressive, confrontational lyrics about urban life with social-political commentary and often radical political messages. The controversial debut album Straight Outta Compton by N.W.A, released in 1988 brought gangsta rap to the mainstream, but it also contained harsh social and political commentary, including the confrontational track "Fuck tha Police."  Ice-T's work would sometimes focus on other topics: for example, he rapped about free speech on his third album, and about drunk driving, domestic violence and Nelson Mandela on his fourth album.

After his departure from the group N.W.A in 1989, Ice Cube embarked on a solo career and released socio-political and conscious rap with gangsta rap elements in his 1990 debut album Amerikkka's Most Wanted and the companion EP Kill at Will; the 1991 album Death Certificate; followed by the 1992 album, The Predator. Furthermore, Ice Cube produced and appeared on the controversial and radical political rap/gangsta rap album Guerillas in tha Mist by Da Lench Mob in the wake of the 1992 Los Angeles Riots. Though Ice Cube would continue to sporadically insert political and social commentary into his music throughout his career, he once again focused on conscious and political rap with his 2006 album Laugh Now, Cry Later and 2008's Raw Footage, featuring the single "Gangsta Rap Made Me Do It", a song dealing with the perceived correlation between music and global issues (e.g. the Iraq War, school shootings, etc.).

Underground rap 

Underground rap, also known as underground hip hop, is a sub-genre of hip hop that is known for its political and socially conscious lyrics. Unlike mainstream rap, which often focuses on themes such as money, power, and fame, underground rap addresses more serious and often controversial topics, such as racism, police brutality, and social inequality.

Underground rap artists are often critical of the government and its policies, and they use their music as a platform to express their political views. Many underground rap songs are highly political, and the lyrics often reflect the artists' personal experiences and perspectives on social and political issues. For example, some songs may address specific incidents of police brutality, while others may discuss the effects of poverty and inequality on communities of color.

One of the main goals of underground rap is to challenge mainstream narratives and to provide an alternative voice to those who are often marginalized or ignored by mainstream media. Many underground rap artists are activists in their own right, and they often use their music to raise awareness about important social and political issues.

In addition to addressing political and social issues, underground rap is also known for its emphasis on artistic creativity and individuality. In contrast to mainstream rap, which often follows a formulaic approach, underground rap is more diverse and experimental in its sound and style. This allows underground rap artists to express themselves in unique and innovative ways, and to create music that is truly original and authentic.

Underground rap is an important sub-genre of hip hop that provides a platform for artists to discuss important political and social issues while also challenging mainstream narratives. By using their music to express their views and experiences, underground rap artists are able to raise awareness about important issues and to inspire others to take action.

The artists who consistently produce conscious rap are largely underground. However, mainstream artists are increasingly including elements of conscious hip-hop in their songs. There are hundreds of artists whose music could be described as "political" or who identify as political rappers: see the list of political hip hop artists page for a partial list.

Hip hop in politics
Hip hop's outreach to the political world is widespread. The response that hip hop has received from mainstream politics has been vast and has resulted in the spread of ideas, opinions, and the formation of an informal dialogue surrounding largely controversial topics.

From the onset of hip hop in the 1980s throughout the 1990s, the culture was either ignored or criticized by politicians on both sides. "In the 1990s... there was one cultural idea that seemed to have bi-partisan support: that rap music was a symptom of the destruction of American values."  In 1992, Vice President Dan Quayle called on Interscope Records to withdraw 2Pacalypse Now because it was a "disgrace to American music". The catalyst for Quayle's outrage was an incident when a Texas youth shot a state trooper and referenced the album as his motivation. In 2Pacalypse Now, rapper Tupac Shakur raised issues of institutional racism, teen pregnancy, and police brutality. He tells a fictional story of how a police officer slams him on the ground for no cause, but before he gets arrested the police officer is shot. His lyrics read "how can I feel guilty after all the things they did to me?"

Today, hip hop music has grown to be such a large part of mainstream culture that The Washington Post wrote "The politician's guide to how to be down with hip hop.",  which draws reference to the use of hip hop culture in politics. The criticism of hip hop that was considered patriotic or even moral one generation ago, can make a politician seem "out of touch", especially with younger voters. Politician Mike Huckabee was viewed as being "out of touch" when he referred to Beyoncé as "mental poison" in his book: God, Guns, Grits, and Gravy. In 2008, during Barack Obama's Democratic primary campaign against then-rival Hillary Clinton, he referenced Jay Z by doing his "Brush the dirt off your shoulder" motion in a rally and the audience erupted with support. The embrace of hip-hop has not occurred on party lines. Republican Senator Marco Rubio is a vocal fan of Tupac and Gangsta rap. Rubio said "In some ways rappers are like reporters... You had gang wars, racial tension, and they were reporting on that."  Donald Trump (Republican), the 45th President of the United States, also leveraged hip-hop to his advantage during his 2016 election campaign. He occasionally quoted that rapper Mac Miller wrote a song called "Donald Trump", and that it has over 100,000,000 views.

In the 2018 midterm elections, lawyer and former rapper Antonio Delgado was elected to New York's 19th congressional district.

Ideology and views of political rappers

United States

Anti-racism, black liberation and nationalism
As hip-hop is a music genre originally created and dominated by African-Americans, political rappers often reference and discuss black liberation. In particular and has a high membership of popular rappers and has had an integral influence on hip hop culture. There are numerous hip hop songs expressing anti-racist views, such as the popular The Black Eyed Peas song "Where Is the Love?", however, artists advocating more for radical black liberation have remained controversial. Artists such as Public Enemy, Tupac Shakur, Ice Cube, Game, and Kendrick Lamar have advocated black liberation in their lyrics and poetry. Tupac Shakur's poem, "How Can We Be Free" Tupac prose the sacrifices of Black political prisoners and the rejection of patriotic symbols. In recent years, Killer Mike and Kendrick Lamar have released songs criticizing the War on Drugs and the prison industrial complex from an anti-racist perspective. Hip hop music continues to draw the attention and support of the struggles of minority groups in a modernist method of communication that attracts a young crowd of activists. Kendrick Lamar and many other rappers have been credited with creating discussions regarding "blackness" through their music.

Anti-poverty, class struggle and socialism
Particularly with the advent of gangsta rap, many hip hop artists happen to come from underclass backgrounds. Aforementioned artists such as Tupac Shakur, Ice Cube, and Killer Mike have made just as much reference to class oppression as racial oppression. Tupac Shakur used his lyrics to incorporate Revolutionary Nationalism. In "Words of Wisdom" from the album 2Pacalypse Now, Shakur's lyrics underscore the refusal to accept economic inequality and inadequate employment opportunities. Other political rappers, such as Public Enemy, The Dope Poet Society,Emcee London Dead Prez, The Coup, Rebel Diaz, Paris and Immortal Technique, have advocated explicitly communist views—mostly leaning to Maoism—whereas some rappers such as Lupe Fiasco and the lesser-known Emcee Lynx, P.O.S, and Sole have advocated anarchist positions. Political references have long been made in hip hop culture; some proving to be effective in spurring constructive discussion and others, such as The Coup's originally planned album cover for Party Music—which depicted the destruction of The World Trade Center to signify the fall of capitalism—receiving negative criticisms (although the album art was designed before the September 11 attacks and was changed prior to its November 2001 release).Justice by Emcee London address corruption amognst Kenyan political class.

Conspiracy theories
Conspiracy theories have been referenced in hip hop lyrics for some time. Elements of the Five-Percenter philosophy that has fundamentally influenced hip hop culture revolve around conspiracy theories. Artists such as Professor Griff, Jedi Mind Tricks, Hopsin, and Hyro the Hero have become infamous for their support of New World Order, Illuminati, and Satanist conspiracy theories, often alleging mainstream hip hop artists, such as Jay-Z, are "involved" in such conspiracies. Rapper B.o.B. is a member of the Flat Earth Society. Hip hop has a long history of discussing conspiracy theories in its music. Some artists, such as Public Enemy and dead prez, have been known to incorporate themes of government corruption and social injustice into their lyrics. In more recent years, artists like Killer Mike and J. Cole have also touched on these topics in their music.

Views on religion
Rappers often reference their religious views. However, outside of Five-Percenters and Black Muslims, they rarely translate into political views. Killer Mike, however, has been heavily critical of organized religion in many of his more political songs. Chicago-raised rapper Kanye West's Life of Pablo album release is another that offers an outlet for religious expression and self-assessment. In January 2019, West began hosting "Sunday Service" events where fans and invited guests can come to listen to choir renditions of his music, gospel songs, and pray.

Worldwide
On a global scale, hip hop's public reputation and exhibition is varied. For instance, Canada's most prominent political hip hop act is The Dope Poet Society, who are known for anti-racist and anti-war activism, as well as denouncing both liberal and conservative politicians. Their politics could be described as third-worldism, or black internationalism. For example, in "Bombay to Zimbabwe," lead rapper Professor D states "from Bombay to Zimbabwe I study sharply: Bob Marley, Marcus Garvey, Mahatma Gandhi, Black Panther Party." Possibly on purpose, these influences seem ideologically contradictory in some ways (e.g. for instance, Marley's subtle socialism vs. Garvey's anti-communism, and non-violence vs. violence) but taken together they represent different approaches to the shared goal of linking anti-racist and anti-colonial struggles in the Americas and the rest of the world. Professor D and The Dope Poet Society also seem to represent this ideology on their album by featuring American political rappers like dead prez and others with rappers from around the world including Nigeria and Colombia. Other examples of hip hop around the world offer opposite perspectives. For example, Lowkey and Iron Sheik have expressed anti-Zionist views in their music, whereas Golan and Subliminal have expressed pro-Zionist views. In France, some political artists such as Suprême NTM, the rapper Casey or Assassin are well known since the early-1990s. Today, rappers like Kery James, La Rumeur, Rocé or Médine are influential; their lyrics speak about colonialism, poverty, French history and sometimes conspiracy theories.

Political hip hop scenes

Spanish- and Portuguese-speaking political hip hop scene
Political rappers of Hispanic, Brazilian or Portuguese descent include Calle 13, Racionais MC's, Olmeca, Tohil, Immortal Technique, Rebel Diaz, Manny Phesto, MRK, Portavoz, Facção Central, Psycho Realm, Ana Tijoux, Bocafloja, Zack de la Rocha, Pablo Hasél (Spain), Los Chikos del Maiz (from Valencia, Spain) and Canserbero.

UK political hip hop scene
Within the United Kingdom hip hop and Grime music scene, political, conscious rap is common, with artists including Lowkey, who focuses on the Israel-Palestine conflict and other issues regarding the Middle East, Logic (a close confidant of Lowkey), Akala, I & Ideal, Mic Righteous, Klashnekoff, Mic Reckless, Riz MC and English Frank.

Prior to the snap election on June 8, 2017, Leader of the Opposition Jeremy Corbyn met with JME while campaigning for the Labour Party to encourage young people to register to vote.

During the interview, JME explained that many young voters don't feel as though politicians have their best interests at heart. He says they often feel that voting makes no difference anyway. He goes on to tell Corbyn that he is the first party leader he feels he can trust, because he is "so genuine it feels like I’m about to meet my mum’s friend".

Australian hip hop scene

Indigenous rappers Briggs and his collaboration with Trials for A.B. Original is one of the most prominent political hip hop artists in Australia. Artists Urthboy, Jimblah, The Herd, Horrorshow and L-Fresh the lion are all part of the Elefant Traks record label, and often have politically motivated songs. Their main focuses are racism and xenophobia but The Herd also focuses on issues of climate, gender inequality and war. Quro's 2007 EP Goodnight Mr. Howard contains overtly political critique of the Howard government and its policies. Some artists have expressed views on domestic violence through their lyrics. One example is the all-female indigenous hip hop group, Oetha, in their 2019 song Disturbing the Peace.

Norwegian rappers
Music created by Norwegian rappers are within the public discourse making them part of the political process, this includes songs, lyrics and performances within the Hip Hop genre. They also disclose how Hip Hop music can be seen as an integral part of the democratic public sphere processes.

Serbian political hip hop
Political Hip-Hop developed in Serbia during UN embargo on FR Yugoslavia in 90's. Most popular Political Hip Hop crew in Serbia is Beogradski Sindikat. They made a controversial song named "Порука Шиптарима" (Translated to English: "Message for Albanians"), and it was the boom of Political Hip Hop in Serbia. During 2000s Political Hip Hop was at its peak, because of the Political situation in Serbia during the beginning of 2000s.
In 2010s Political Hip Hop wasn't much popular in Serbia anymore, but it was still one of the most popular genres in the country. Year 2020 revived Political Hip Hop again because of the whole situation in the world. The 2020 Elections in Serbia, Corona, Masks, lockdown and other.

Iranian political hip hop
Due to the long history of Human rights violations by the Islamic Republic of Iran, there are a lot of Iranian rappers who are noted for addressing the contemporary social and political issues through their songs. Some well-known examples of Iranian political hip hop artists include Hichkas, Fadaei, Shapur, Quf, Yas and Toomaj Salehi. Since it is illegal to criticize the government and social issues in Iran, most of the Iranian rappers live abroad.

Rapper Toomaj Salehi, who unlike the other rappers, lives in Iran, was arrested during the Mahsa Amini protests on October 30, 2022, for his social awareness activities on his social media and releasing two protest songs "Battleground" and "Omen" during the protests. On November 27, 2022, Iranian media revealed that Salehi was charged with "corruption on Earth", an offense which could carry the death penalty. Salehi became one of the well known faces of the revolutionary movement "Woman, Life, Freedom", denouncing the repression by the demonstrators' regime. He has since been reportedly in solitary confinement and under torture.

See also
Protest music
List of political hip hop artists
Jihadism and hip-hop
Hip hop feminism
Hip hop and social injustice

References

Bibliography
Bogdanov, Vladimir; Woodstra, Chris; Erlewine, Stephen Thomas; Bush, John (2003). The Definitive Guide to Rap & Hip-Hop. Backbeat Books, .

Hip hop genres
20th-century music genres
21st-century music genres
American hip hop genres
Political music genres